Steven Karl Pifer (born 1953) is a senior fellow at the Brookings Institution's Center on the United States and Europe as well as the director of Brookings' Arms Control Initiative. He was formerly senior adviser with the Center for Strategic & International Studies in Washington, D.C., and the third United States Ambassador to Ukraine from 1998 to 2000.

Education
Pifer graduated from Stanford University with a B.A. in economics in 1976.

Career
He served at the United States Embassies in Warsaw, London and Moscow, and as advisor on the U.S. delegation to the negotiations on intermediate-range nuclear forces in Geneva.

From 1978 to 2004 he was a foreign service officer with the US Dept. of State. From 1996 to 1997, he served special assistant to the president and senior director for Russia, Ukraine and Eurasia on the National Security Council. 
From 1998 to 2000, he served as the United States Ambassador to Ukraine. 
From 2001 to 2004, he served as deputy assistant secretary of state in the Bureau of European and Eurasian Affairs, with responsibility for Russia and Ukraine.

He was a visiting scholar at the Stanford Institute for International Studies in 2000–2001."

Publications

Pifer is author of "The Opportunity: Next Steps in Reducing Nuclear Arms" with Michael E. O'Hanlon.

References

External links

 Embassy of the United States KYIV-UKRAINE
 

Living people
Ambassadors of the United States to Ukraine
1953 births
United States Foreign Service personnel
Stanford University alumni
20th-century American diplomats
Brookings Institution people